Čechy may refer to:

Place names 
 Czech Republic
 Čechy, the Czech name for Bohemia
 Střední Čechy, the Central Bohemian Region
 Čechy (Přerov District), a village and municipality (obec) in Přerov District, Olomouc Region
 Čechy pod Kosířem, a village and municipality (obec) in Prostějov District, Olomouc Region
 Slovakia
 Čechy (Komáromcsehi), a village and municipality in the Nové Zámky District, Nitra Region, Slovakia

Other 
 21257 Jižní Čechy, a main belt asteroid

See also 
 Lech, Czech and Rus
 Czechy (disambiguation)
 Csehi, a village in Hungary
 Čech (disambiguation)
 Czech (disambiguation)